Kenya competed in the 2008 Summer Olympics held in Beijing, People's Republic of China from August 8 to August 24, 2008. Kenya won a total of 14 medals, 6 of them gold, its best ever performance at the Olympics.

Kenya sent a total of 46 athletes, 28 men and 18 women, to the 2008 Summer Olympics. Four Kenyan men won six gold medals, while the other two were awarded to the women. The remaining medals won by Kenyans were four silver and six bronze medals. Among the nation's gold medalists was Brimin Kipruto, who brought home the nation's seventh straight medal in the steeplechase since 1984. Coming in at a close third was Richard Matelong who was unable to surpass the Frenchman Mahiedine Mekhissi-Benabbad. Kenya also marked its Olympic debut in taekwondo by sending two athletes, one man and one woman.  
For the first time in Olympic history, the Kenyan athletes had participated in the women's 800 meter event final.  Shortly after the 3,000 meter steeplechase, the women captured a gold medal against many odds.  Along with the gold, they also took home the silver as well.  Pamela Jelimo led her fellow Kenyan Janeth Jepkosgei Busienei to a one-two finish.

Marathon runner Samuel Wanjiru did not only bring home the gold medal for the Kenyans, but also broke the 24-year-old Olympic record set by Carlos Lopes.

The Kenyans finished the Olympics being the most successful African country in the Beijing Olympics, and 13th place in the overall country standings.

Medalists

Athletics

The following athletes have been selected for the Olympics:

Men

Women

Key
Note–Ranks given for track events are within the athlete's heat only
Q = Qualified for the next round
q = Qualified for the next round as a fastest loser or, in field events, by position without achieving the qualifying target
NR = National record
N/A = Round not applicable for the event
Bye = Athlete not required to compete in round

Boxing

Kenya qualified five boxers for the Olympic boxing tournament. Bilali was the only boxer to qualify at the first African qualifying event. The other four boxers all earned spots at the second African tournament. In addition, welterweight boxer Nickson Abaka qualified for the Olympics, but missed the event due to injury.

Rowing

A sole Kenyan rower has qualified for the Olympics:

Men

Swimming

Kenya sent two swimmers to Beijing.

Men

Taekwondo

Two Kenyan taekwondo jins will compete at the 2008 olympics:

See also
Kenya at the 2006 Commonwealth Games
Kenya at the 2008 Summer Paralympics
Kenya at the 2010 Commonwealth Games

References

External links
sports-reference

Nations at the 2008 Summer Olympics
2008
Summer Olympics